Andrej Benda (born 25 September 1975) is a Slovak former athlete and bobsledder. He competed in the four man event at the 2006 Winter Olympics. Benda was also a national champion in the long jump.

References

External links
 

1975 births
Living people
Slovak male bobsledders
Olympic bobsledders of Slovakia
Bobsledders at the 2006 Winter Olympics
Sportspeople from Bratislava